The NCAA Women's Outdoor Track and Field Championship refers to one of three annual collegiate outdoor track and field competitions for women organised by the National Collegiate Athletic Association (NCAA) for athletes from institutions that make up its three divisions: Division I, II, and III. In each event athlete's individual performances earn points for their institution and the team with the most points receives the NCAA team title in track and field.
NCAA Division I Women's Outdoor Track and Field Championships
NCAA Division II Women's Outdoor Track and Field Championships
NCAA Division III Women's Outdoor Track and Field Championships

A separate NCAA men's competition is also held.

See also
AIAW Intercollegiate Women's Outdoor Track and Field Champions
NCAA Women's Indoor Track and Field Championship
NCAA Men's Indoor Track and Field Championship
NCAA Men's Outdoor Track and Field Championship

 
Women's sports competitions in the United States
Outdoor